The Elvetham air crash occurred on 5 October 1945 when a Consolidated Liberator GR.VI aircraft, serial number KG867, of 311 Squadron Royal Air Force crashed at Elvetham, east of Hartley Wintney, Hampshire, following a fire in one of its engines and fuel starvation to another.

The aircraft was about five minutes into a flight from nearby RAF Blackbushe to Ruzyně Airport, Prague, Czechoslovakia. The crash killed all 23 people aboard: five crew, 17 official passengers and one stowaway.

All 23 victims were Czechoslovak. They included nine women and five very young children. The crash was the largest single loss of life in an accident involving Free Czechoslovaks serving in the RAF Volunteer Reserve. After the crash the Czechoslovak Government switched the repatriation of its nationals from air to surface transport.

Aircraft
Consolidated Aircraft had designed and built the four-engined B-24 Liberator as a long-range maritime patrol aircraft and heavy bomber. The GR.VI was a maritime patrol version that 311 Squadron had flown under RAF Coastal Command since June 1943. The Allies' need for such patrols was reduced by the surrender of Germany in May 1945 and ended by the surrender of Japan in August.

However, the need for military transport aircraft remained high. Military transport tasks in the months after the end of hostilities included restoring transport links with recently liberated countries in what had been German-occupied Europe. Aircraft were needed to deliver supplies and equipment, and to repatriate nationals of formerly-occupied countries who had served in Allied forces. In their years of exile many of those nationals had got married and started families whom they now wished to take home with them.

Therefore, in June 1945, 311 Squadron was transferred to RAF Transport Command and started flying GR.VI Liberators that had been converted into military transport aircraft. In each aircraft a temporary wooden floor covered the bomb bay doors. A cargo and passenger doorway was inserted in one side of the fuselage. If passengers were to be carried, wooden benches were installed. The colours of the aircraft remained as they had been under Coastal Command: white on the sides and underneath, with camouflage only on the upper surfaces. In August 1945, 311 Squadron was transferred from RAF Manston in Kent, England to Ruzyně Airport, Prague, Czechoslovakia to continue transport operations.

Flight history
Aircraft KG867 carried the marking PP-N. PP was the code for 311 Squadron and -N identified the individual aircraft. Its captain was Pilot Officer Jaroslav Kudláček, a 25-year-old from Chrudim in eastern Bohemia. He had 1,421 flying hours' experience, 512 hours of which were on four-engined aircraft. Kudláček had married a British woman, their first son had been born in October 1941 and the family was looking forward to the boy's fourth birthday. Kudláček had just returned from the Royal Hospital, Wolverhampton, where Mrs Kudláčková had given birth to their second son about 10 days previously.

KG867 was scheduled to make a  flight from Blackbushe to Ruzyně on Thursday 4 October to repatriate Czechoslovak service personnel and their families to their homeland. P/O Kudláček tried three times to take off but aborted each time because of a problem with one of the engines. After Kudláček aborted the third attempt the flight was postponed until the next day to let KG867 be examined and repaired.

One account states that the passengers were given temporary accommodation for the night. But another account, by Warrant Officer Pavel Svoboda of 311 Squadron, said "We spent a very unpleasant night, due to a lack of accommodation, especially the women with children."

By the next morning KG867's passenger manifest had been changed. Two 311 Squadron personnel who had been booked to fly as passengers – Warrant Officer Svoboda and WAAF Leading Aircraftwoman First Class Edita Sedláková – were displaced and their seats were reallocated to other passengers.

On Friday 5 October three Liberators including the rescheduled KG867 were to take off from Blackbushe. KG867 got airborne in good weather. Differing accounts suggest that it took off at either 1243 hours or 1420 hours. The aircraft made a normal circuit of the airfield as it turned to head for Prague. At the Liberator's cruising speed of  the flight could be expected to take more than three hours, so KG867 was carrying a substantial amount of fuel.

Engine fire and crash
Then about three minutes into the flight, witnesses on the ground saw a fire had broken out on the aircraft's main wing around the No. 2 (inner port) engine. One Witness, George Greenwood of 4167 Squadron RAF, said he saw "a great plume of black smoke from one of the engines".

The plane was losing height and Kudláček tried to turn back to the airfield. About  short of the airfield KG867 turned steeply to port, with the port wing down and diving at an angle of 30 degrees. About five minutes after take-off the port wing clipped a hedge causing the port engines to hit the ground in a field of sugar beet at Elvetham, east of Hartley Wintney. The aircraft cartwheeled, disintegrated and burst into flames.

The field was part of the Elvetham Hall estate of Sir Fitzroy Calthorpe, Baronet. A group of gypsies had been trimming the sugar beet and were sitting around a log fire eating a meal.

In another field nearby a group of children was helping a farmer to pick potatoes. One girl, who was 12 at the time, recalled seeing KG867 fly over with its port wing down and both starboard engines "running very fast" before passing out of sight and crashing. The farmer told the children each to take a large potato and go home. She recalled that for days afterwards "Nobody was allowed to go anywhere near the crash. There were many lorries and people at the site for almost a week investigating the wreckage."

George Greenwood recalled that RAF Blackbushe was "stunned into silence". Another of the 311 Squadron Liberators due to fly that day was already taxiing on the airfield when KG867 crashed. The control tower recalled it and instructed the aircraft to wait. But later it was cleared to take off, and its crew was not told of the crash until after they had landed in Prague.

Victims
The accident killed all 23 people aboard the aircraft. The five crew consisted of a pilot, co-pilot, navigator, wireless operator and flight engineer. The co-pilot was Warrant Officer Antonín Brož, aged 31, from Hradec Králové in northern Bohemia. The flight engineer was Flight Sergeant Zdeněk Sedlák, aged 33, from Prague, who was the husband of LACW Sedláková who had been booked to travel on the flight but whose seat had been reallocated to another passenger.

The 17 official passengers included nine women, one of whom was Marina Paulinyová, aged 46, who was Vice-Chairman of the Czechoslovak Red Cross in London. Also among the passengers were five children travelling with their mothers. The eldest, Eva Šafranková, was three years old. Jiři Rosenblum and Helena Žaludová were two years old. Twins Ladíslav Soběslavsky and Marenka Soběslavská were just 18 months old.

The body of another person was found at the crash site. It was so badly burned that investigators could not tell if it was that of a man or a woman. At first its identity was a mystery. But LACW Sedláková, the wife of Flt Sgt Sedlák, the flight engineer, had been reported missing after KG867 took off and she failed to return home to her flat in London.

Sedláková had been born Edita Hermannová, a Czechoslovak Jew who reached the UK as a Winton refugee in 1939. Her father had already died at that time and her brother Kurt had entered UK independently as a refugee a few months earlier in 1939. The Germans had murdered their mother, Hedvika, at Auschwitz in October 1944. After schooling in England Edita enlisted in the WAAF and was posted to 311 Squadron, where she and Sedlák met. They were married in May 1945. Sedláková was described as "a high-spirited girl" who was "deeply in love with her husband". About a fortnight before the crash, Sedláková had secured her discharge from the RAF so that she and Sedlák could return to their homeland together. She was last seen at Blackbushe in the vicinity of luggage that was to be loaded onto the aircraft. Either by herself or with the help of others she had boarded KG867 unauthorised. Sedláková was the only WAAF fatality in the six-year history of 311 Squadron.

Being displaced from the flight saved Warrant Officer Svoboda's life. He recalled "my name was taken off the manifest to go, and I was replaced by reason I was never informed" (sic).

This particular change to the passenger manifest regarding Svoboda has been updtaed by more recent information. Following a ‘Facebook’ posting about the 1945 Liberator disaster in December 2017 by the War Graves Photographic Project, Sue Albery responded. She indicated that her parents, Doris and Eddy Hrabak had given up their seats on the flight to Edith and Zdenĕk. If this was so, then some good came out of the tragic circumstances. As Sue writes in her post, if her parents had not given up their seats ‘I would not be writing this.’

Cause
Débris was scattered at the crash site. Burnt pieces of cowling from the inner port engine were found about  before the point of impact. Other wreckage was thrown up to  ahead of the point of impact.

The official investigation found:
The port inner engine caught fire due to a petrol escape from a ruptured pipe between the carburettor and oil dilution valve due to chafing. Ignition believed to be from exhaust pipe conduit to turbo supercharger.
The fuel pipe would then have been burnt away, which would have caused fuel starvation to the No. 1 (outer port) engine. With the port wing on fire and both port engines out of action, the aircraft would have been increasingly difficult to control.

The aircraft had no fire detection or warning devices. But it had two built-in CO2 fire extinguishers to fight engine fires. The extinguishers were not automatic. There was a control panel on the starboard side of the cockpit, from which the co-pilot would operate the extinguishers when instructed by the pilot. Investigators found that both of the extinguishers had been discharged. This suggested that a member of the crew, presumably the co-pilot, Warrant Officer Brož, had tried to extinguish the engine fire.

Access to the control panel was poor, as it was partly obstructed by an emergency pump for the aircraft's hydraulic equipment. The fire extinguisher control panel included selector switches for the co-pilot to select which of the four engines to douse with CO2. Investigators found that aboard KG867 the selector switch for the port engines was in the "off" position and the selector for the starboard engines was switched to extinguish the inner starboard engine. This suggested that in the emergency, Warrant Officer Brož may have selected to extinguish the wrong engine by mistake.

The presence of an unauthorised extra passenger aboard, LACW Sedláková, was not considered to have contributed to the accident.

Aftermath and burials
On 6 October 1945 the Czechoslovak Government announced it had terminated the repatriation of its nationals from the UK by air transport. Thereafter they were sent by ship from a British port to Ostend in Belgium, and then onward by train across Belgium and Germany with the assistance of NMBS/SNCB. The Czechoslovak Embassy in London announced that about 400 people would leave Britain by sea for Ostend on 11 October, followed by about another 400 on 26 October and about 1,200 in November.

Also on 11 October, 18 of the victims of the crash were buried at Brookwood Cemetery in Surrey. All five of the aircrew were laid to rest in the Czechoslovak section of Brookwood Military Cemetery. 13 of the passengers share a common grave in part of the civilian cemetery in Long Avenue called the Old Roman Catholic Ground. The common grave has one headstone bearing the names of those 13 passengers, including stowaway Edita Sedláková. A separate, smaller plaque commemorating Sedláková's RAF service was added in front of the monument in November 2015.

Five of the passengers are not buried in the shared grave at Brookwood. They are Marta Obrazová, Jiři Rosenblum, Anna Rosenblumová, Otto Schwarz and Helena Wodaková.

See also

1945 in aviation
1942 Ruislip Wellington accident, in which a Vickers Wellington of 311 Squadron crashed at South Ruislip, killing all 15 people aboard plus six civilians on the ground
Sutton Wick air crash, in which a wrongly-fitted non-return valve caused fuel starvation on an RAF Blackburn Beverley transport aircraft in 1957, leading it to crash and burst into flames near Abingdon-on-Thames

References

Bibliography

 Hermann, Michael, Eighty Years On, 3P Publishing, Corby, 2019. ISBN 978-1-911559-71-9

External links

1945 disasters in the United Kingdom
1945 in England
20th century in Hampshire
Accidents and incidents involving Royal Air Force aircraft
Accidents and incidents involving the Consolidated B-24 Liberator
Aviation accidents and incidents caused by in-flight fires
Aviation accidents and incidents in 1945
Aviation accidents and incidents in England
Disasters in Hampshire
Military history of Czechoslovakia during World War II
October 1945 events in the United Kingdom
Transport in Hampshire